The Roman Catholic Diocese of Witbank is a diocese located in the city of Witbank in the ecclesiastical province of Johannesburg in South Africa.

History
 June 12, 1923: Established as Apostolic Prefecture of Lydenburg from the Apostolic Vicariate of Transvaal
 December 9, 1948: Promoted as Apostolic Vicariate of Lydenburg
 January 11, 1951: Promoted as Diocese of Lydenburg
 September 13, 1964: Renamed as Diocese of Lydenburg – Witbank
 November 10, 1987: Renamed as Diocese of Witbank

Bishops
 Prefect Apostolic of Lydenburg (Roman rite)
 Fr. Giovanni Riegler, M.C.C.I. (1939.06.30 – 1948.12.09 see below)
 Vicar Apostolic of Lydenburg (Roman rite)
 Bishop Giovanni Riegler, M.C.C.I. (see above 1948.12.09 – 1951.01.11 see below)
 Bishops of Lydenburg (Roman rite)
 Bishop Giovanni Riegler, M.C.C.I. (see above 1951.01.11 – 1955.10.06)
 Bishop Anthony Reiterer, M.C.C.I. (1956.02.29 – 1964.09.13 see below)
 Bishops of Lydenburg – Witbank (Roman rite)
 Bishop Anthony Reiterer, M.C.C.I. (see above 1964.09.13 – 1983.02.25)
 Bishop Mogale Paul Nkhumishe (1984.01.09 – 1987.11.10 see below)
 Bishops of Witbank (Roman rite)
 Bishop Mogale Paul Nkhumishe (see above 1987.11.10 – 2000.02.17), appointed Bishop of Pietersburg
 Bishop Paul Mandla Khumalo, C.M.M. (2001.10.02 – 2008.11.24), appointed Archishop of Pretoria
 Bishop Giuseppe Sandri, M.C.C.J. (2009.11.05 – 2019.05.30)
 Bishop Xolelo Thaddaeus Kumalo (since 2020.11.25)

Auxiliary Bishop
Mogale Paul Nkhumishe (1981-1984), appointed Bishop here

Other priest of this diocese who became bishop
João Noé Rodrigues, appointed Bishop of Tzaneen in 2010

See also
Roman Catholicism in South Africa

Sources
 GCatholic.org
 Catholic Hierarchy

Roman Catholic dioceses in South Africa
Christian organizations established in 1965
Roman Catholic dioceses and prelatures established in the 20th century
Roman Catholic Diocese of Witbank
 
Roman Catholic Ecclesiastical Province of Johannesburg